Highway 925 is an unpaved provincial highway in the far northern region of the Canadian province of Saskatchewan. It begins about ten kilometres south of Buffalo Narrows on Highway 155 and ends in Michel Village.

Highway 925 goes around the south and west side of Peter Pond Lake to reach Michel Village and passes near the communities of Dillon (Buffalo River) and St. George's Hill.

See also 
Roads in Saskatchewan
Transportation in Saskatchewan

References 

925